Daniel Terra may refer to:

 Daniel J. Terra (1911–1996), American scientist, businessman and art lover
 Daniel Terra, a leader of Brazil's Revolutionary Movement 8th October